The List of shipwrecks in 1778 includes some ships sunk, wrecked or otherwise lost during 1778.

January

1 January

February

7 February

11 February

16 February

March

7 March

12 March

22 March

23 March

27 March

28 March

30 March

31 March

Unknown March

April

5 April

6 April

9 April

12 April

13 April

14 April

19 April

20 April

24 April

27 April

30 April

Unknown April

May

1 May

5 May

6 May

8 May

9 May

10 May

11 May

12 May

13 May

14 May

18 May

19 May

24 May

25 May

26 May

29 May

30 May

31 May

Unknown date

June

13 June

July

6 July

8 July

31 July

August

1 August

5 August

6 August

20 August

21 August

24 August

Unknown date

September

5 September

25 September

October

3 October

6 October

9 October

22 October

Unknown date

November

2 November

22 November

December

1 December

9 December

26 December

28 December

29 December

31 December

Unknown date

Unknown date

References

1778